The John Carroll Blue Streaks football program is the intercollegiate American football team for John Carroll University located in the U.S. state of Ohio. They compete in the National Collegiate Athletic Association (NCAA) at the Division III level and are members of the Ohio Athletic Conference (OAC). The team was established in 1920 and plays its home games at the 5,416 seat Don Shula Stadium. As of the 2016 season, John Carroll has won 11 Conference titles, 4 in their current conference, the OAC. Drew Nystrom serves as the interim head football coach. During the 2022 season, John Carroll will celebrate its 100th season of football.

Rivals
John Carroll has two predominant rivals.

Baldwin Wallace Yellow Jackets –  The rivalry dates back to 1923, with John Carroll leading the all-time series 30–25–4. The series drew huge crowds during the 1930s and 1940s during Cleveland's Big Four college football era, when games were played at Cleveland Municipal Stadium and League Park.  Since 1989, a rivalry has been dubbed the Cuyahoga Gold Bowl. John Carroll has won nine straight over Baldwin Wallace, including a 29-28 win on November 13, 2021 that featured an 18-point fourth quarter comeback.

Mount Union Purple Raiders – On November 12, 2016, the Blue Streaks ended Mount Union's 112 regular season game win streak.  Mount Union holds a 34–3–2 all-time series lead.

Notable alumni
Graham Armstrong – professional football player, Cleveland Rams and Buffalo Bills
Tom Arth – professional football player, Indianapolis Colts and Green Bay Packers, former head coach for Akron Zips football
David Caldwell – former general manager, Jacksonville Jaguars
Nick Caserio – general manager, Houston Texans
Enrique Ecker – professional football player, Chicago Bears, Green Bay Packers, and Washington Redskins
London Fletcher – former NFL linebacker for the St. Louis Rams, Buffalo Bills, and Washington Redskins
Josh McDaniels – head coach of the Las Vegas Raiders, former head coach of the Denver Broncos
Brian Polian – college football coach
Chris Polian – American football scout and executive, NFL
Chuck Priefer – assistant coach, NFL
Greg Roman –  offensive coordinator of the Baltimore Ravens, former for the Buffalo Bills and San Francisco 49ers
Don Shula – professional football player and Hall of Fame coach, Baltimore Colts and Miami Dolphins
Carl Taseff – professional football player and coach, Baltimore Colts, Buffalo Bills, and Miami Dolphins
Tom Telesco – general manager, Los Angeles Chargers
Jerry Schuplinski – assistant coach, Las Vegas Raiders
Ken O'Keefe – quarterbacks coach, University of Iowa
Nick Caley – tight ends coach, New England Patriots
Frank Ross – assistant coach, NFL Houston Texans
Dave Ziegler – general manager, Las Vegas Raiders

References

 
1920 establishments in Ohio
American football teams established in 1920